Echo Brickell is a skyscraper in the Brickell district of Downtown Miami, Florida, United States. It was developed by Kevin P. Maloney's Property Markets Group.

Incidents
On October 19, 2016, one person was killed and several others were injured after a construction accident in which a scaffold fell from the top of the building. Another scaffolding collapse took place at the construction site of Hyde Resort & Residences in Hollywood, Florida, also under lead contractor John Moriarty & Associates.

References

External links
 
 Rendering of the Echo Brickell
 Echo Brickell at Emporis

Residential condominiums in Miami
Residential skyscrapers in Miami
2017 establishments in Florida
Residential buildings completed in 2017